Shioya (written: 塩屋) is a Japanese surname. Notable people with the surname include:

Kōzō Shioya (born 1955), Japanese voice actor
Shun Shioya (born 1982), Japanese actor
Yoku Shioya (born 1958), Japanese voice actor, brother of Kōzō

Japanese-language surnames